Malekudy Joseph Antony, better known as Antony Perumbavoor is an Indian film producer, distributor, cinema exhibitor and actor, who works in Malayalam film industry. He began his career as a chauffeur to Mohanlal in 1987 and started appearing in brief roles in Malayalam films in 1990s. In 2000, he established the film production house Aashirvad Cinemas, which exclusively produces Mohanlal films. Antony owns the multiplex theatre chain Aashirvad Cineplexx and co-owns the film distribution company Maxlab Cinemas and Entertainments. He is the president of Film Exhibitors United Organisation of Kerala (FEUOK).

As a producer, he has received several awards, including two National Film Awards, four Kerala State Film Awards and a Filmfare Awards South among others.

Early life and family 
Malekudy Joseph Antony was born as the son of Joseph and Elamma. He hails from Perumbavoor in Ernakulam district, Kerala and studied in a government upper primary school in Iringole, Perumbavoor and MGM Higher Secondary School in Kuruppampady. Antony is married to Shanti and the couple have two childrenAnisha and Ashish Joe Antony. He resides in Aimury, Perumbavoor.

Career 

During the filming of Mohanlal-starrer Pattanapravesham in 1988, Antony joined the film crew as a temporary driver in the filming location, during which he worked as a chauffeur to Mohanlal in its 22 days long shooting schedule before departing back to his hometown. Later, when Antony was a spectator during the filming of Mohanlal's Moonnam Mura (1988) in Ambalamugal, Kerala, he was recognised by Mohanlal from the crowd and invited to join again as chauffeur. At some point later during this time, Mohanlal invited him to join as his permanent chauffeur, which he accepted.

In 2000, he established the film production company Aashirvad Cinemas, debuting with Mohanlal-starring action drama Narasimham, which became the highest-grossing Malayalam film to that date. Until 2009, the films of Aarshirvad Cinemas were distributed by Swargachitra and later by Central Pictures. In 2009, Antony along with Mohanlal and industrialist K. C. Babu established the film distribution company Maxlab Cinemas and Entertainments, debuting with Sagar Alias Jacky Reloaded.

In 2016, Antony established his first multiplex theater, Aashirvad Cineplexx in Perumbavoor and later opened its chain in other regions in the state. In 2017, Antony was elected the vice-president of the newly formed Film Exhibitors United Organisation of Kerala (FEUOK), an organisation comprising producers, distributors, and exhibitors in Malayalam film industry. Since July 2017, he is the president of FEUOK. in 2019, Aashirvad Cinemas opened office in Hong Kong under the name Feitian Aashirvad Cinemas.

Filmography

Acting credits

Production

Distribution

Accolades 
National Film Awards
 2012: Best Film on Other Social Issues – Spirit
 2019: Best Feature Film – Marakkar: Arabikadalinte Simham
Kerala State Film Awards
 2001: Best Film with Popular Appeal and Aesthetic Value – Raavanaprabhu
 2008: Best Film with Popular Appeal and Aesthetic Value – Innathe Chintha Vishayam
 2009: Best Film with Popular Appeal and Aesthetic Value – Evidam Swargamanu
 2013: Best Film with Popular Appeal and Aesthetic Value – Drishyam

Filmfare Awards South
 2013: Best Film – Malayalam - Drishyam

South Indian International Movie Awards
2013: Best Film in Malayalam – Drishyam

Asianet Film Awards
 2000: Best Film – Narasimham
 2012: Most Popular Film – Spirit
 2013: Best Film – Drishyam
 2013: Most Popular Film – Drishyam
 2016: Best Film – Oppam

Jaihind TV Awards
2007: Best Film – Paradesi
2013: Best Film - ‘’Drishyam’’

Kairali TV – World Malayali Council Film Award
2009: Best Film – Evidam Swargamanu

References

External links 
 

Malayali people
Malayalam film producers
Film producers from Kerala
Businesspeople from Kochi
Businesspeople from Kerala
Film producers from Kochi
21st-century Indian businesspeople
Kerala State Film Award winners
Male actors in Malayalam cinema
Filmfare Awards South winners
1968 births
Living people
Telugu film producers